Fred Schuyler Jackson (April 19, 1868 – November 21, 1931) was a U.S. Representative from Kansas.

Born in Stanton, Kansas, Jackson moved to Greenwood County, Kansas, with his parents in 1881. He attended the public schools of Miami and Greenwood Counties. He taught school in Kansas from 1885 to 1890. He was graduated in law from the University of Kansas at Lawrence in 1892. He was admitted to the bar and commenced practice in Eureka, Kansas. He served as prosecuting attorney of Greenwood County from 1893 to 1897. He served as assistant State attorney general in 1906 and 1907. Attorney general 1907–1911.

Jackson was elected as a Republican to the Sixty-second Congress (March 4, 1911 – March 3, 1913).
He was an unsuccessful candidate for reelection in 1912 to the Sixty-third Congress. He resumed the practice of law in Eureka and Topeka, Kansas. He moved to Topeka, Kansas, in 1915, having been appointed attorney for the Public Utilities Commission of Kansas and served until 1924. He resumed the practice of law in Topeka, Kansas. He also engaged in agricultural pursuits and stock raising in Greenwood, Wabaunsee, and Jefferson Counties. He died in Topeka, Kansas on November 21, 1931. He was interred in Greenwood Cemetery, Eureka, Kansas.

References

1868 births
1931 deaths
Kansas Attorneys General
Republican Party members of the United States House of Representatives from Kansas
People from Miami County, Kansas
People from Eureka, Kansas
People from Topeka, Kansas